"Cheer Up, Boys (Your Make Up Is Running)" is the third single released from the Foo Fighters' 2007 album Echoes, Silence, Patience & Grace. The single was released as a digital-only release in the UK via iTunes. No physical retail singles were released; however, promotional singles were released for radio airplay. The B-side is a cover of Paul McCartney & Wings' "Band on the Run", which was previously released on Radio 1 Established 1967.

Reception
Dave Grohl commented on the song, saying "For this song, it was a working title that stuck, because that was a song that we had demoed and it sounded like this really bright, poppy, late '80s R.E.M. song that would have been off their 'Green' or something like that." AllMusic editor Stephen Thomas Erlewine says the song has a riff as nimble as those on Foo Fighters' debut album.

Other versions
A live version filmed at Wembley Stadium on June 7, 2008, was released on the Live at Wembley Stadium DVD.

Track listing
 "Cheer Up, Boys (Your Make Up Is Running)" – 3:41
 "Band on the Run" – 5:09 (Paul McCartney and Wings cover, 2007)

Personnel
 Dave Grohl – lead vocals, rhythm guitar
 Chris Shiflett – lead guitar, backing vocals
 Nate Mendel – bass
 Taylor Hawkins – drums, backing vocals

References

2008 singles
Foo Fighters songs
Songs written by Dave Grohl
Song recordings produced by Gil Norton
2007 songs
RCA Records singles
Songs written by Taylor Hawkins
Songs written by Nate Mendel
Songs written by Chris Shiflett